Naiki Devi (IAST: Nāikī Devī )  was the regent queen of Chaulukya dynasty during her son Mularaja II's infancy from 1175. She was a queen of the Chaulukya king Ajayapala.

Biography 

Her earlier life is not known, according to Prabandhachintamani of Merutunga, she was daughter of one Paramardi. One theory identifies this Paramardi as the Kadamba king Permadi-deva, but according to historian Ashoke Kumar Majumdar, she was likely the daughter of the Chandela king Paramardi (reigned c. 1165-1203 CE). 

She was married to Chaulukya ruler Ajayapala and had son named Mularaja, who later became king after his father's death. When her son succeeded his father as king in 1175, she became regent during the minority of her son. 

In 1175, Muhammad of Ghor crossed the Indus, capturing Multan and Uch before penetrating in present-day Gujarat through the Thar Desert in 1178. Muhammad of Ghor was routed by Mularaja II and his Rajput allies from Nadol, Jalore and Abu at the Battle of Kasahrada. The location of battle is identified as a village named Kayandra near foothills of Abu hills.   Persian chroniclers Minhaj al-Siraj and Ferishta mentioned that Muhammad of Ghor was routed by Bhima II (Mularaja brother and successor), although the epigraphic evidences confirmed that Mularaja II was ruling at the time of Ghurid invasion.

A later account of Merutunga states that Naiki devi took her son Mularaja in her lap and marched at the head of the Chaulukya army and defeated the Ghurid forces at Gāḍarāraghaṭṭa pass and secured for her son title of "vanquisher of the king of Ghazni". However, Ashoke Kumar Majumdar criticised the writing of Merutunga who used mythical stories to fascinate his readers. In any case, Merutunga is dismissed as "completely unreliable" by modern scholars .

In popular culture 
The 2022 Gujarati historical film Nayika Devi: The Warrior Queen  stars Khushi Shah as Naiki Devi.

References 

Indian women in war
Regents of India
Women in 12th-century warfare
12th-century Indian women
12th-century Indian people
Indian queen consorts
12th-century women rulers